Acrobasis bouchirella is a species of snout moth in the genus Acrobasis. It was described by Hans Georg Amsel in 1951. It is found in Iran.

References

Moths described in 1951
Acrobasis
Moths of Asia